The IMCAMA Building, also known informally as the Sony Building is an Art Deco building in Casablanca, Morocco. It is located at Place Saint-Exupéry, at the junction of Lorraine Boulevard and Agadir Street.

It was designed by Albert Greslin in 1928. It faces the Arab League Park.

Name 
"IMCAMA" stands for Société Immobilière de Casablanca et Maroc.

Références 

Buildings and structures in Casablanca
Commercial buildings in Morocco